Jamāl al-Dīn b. Muhammad al-Annī (d. 1882) was one of Islamic scholars from Annā, Rayya, Wollo, Ethiopia. He introduced Qādirī order in the region. He qualified many scholars like Muḥammad al-Dānī  who later became his khalīfa (successor) at Dana, Habru, Ethiopia. He died and was buried in Koramē, a place in Habru district, North Wollo, Ethiopia.

He is said to have composed 99 works on dhikr and ṣalawāt including Kifāyat al-ṭālibīn fī maʿrifat muhimmāt al-dīn.

References

19th-century Muslim theologians
Islam in Ethiopia
Qadiri order
19th-century Ethiopian people
 1882 deaths